The Mixmaster universe (named after Sunbeam Mixmaster, a brand of Sunbeam Products electric kitchen mixer) is a solution to Einstein field equations of general relativity studied by Charles Misner in an effort to better understand the dynamics of the early universe. He hoped to solve the horizon problem in a natural way by showing that the early universe underwent an oscillatory, chaotic epoch.

Discussion

The model is similar to the closed Friedmann–Lemaître–Robertson–Walker universe, in that spatial slices are positively curved and are topologically three-spheres . In the Mixmaster universe, the  can expand or contract, but also distort anisotropically. Its evolution is described by a scale factor  as well as by two shape parameters . Values of the shape parameters describe distortions of the  that preserve its volume and also maintain a constant Ricci curvature scalar. Therefore, as the three parameters  assume different values, homogeneity but not isotropy is preserved.

The model has a rich dynamical structure. Misner showed that the shape parameters  act like the coordinates of a point mass moving in a triangular potential with steeply rising walls with friction. By studying the motion of this point, Misner showed that the physical universe would expand in some directions and contract in others, with the directions of expansion and contraction changing repeatedly. Because the potential is roughly triangular, Misner suggested that the evolution is chaotic.

Metric

The metric studied by Misner (very slightly modified from his notation) is given by,

where

In terms of the coordinates . These satisfy

where  is the exterior derivative and  the wedge product of differential forms. The 1-forms  form a left-invariant co-frame on the Lie group SU(2), which is diffeomorphic to the 3-sphere ,  so  the spatial metric in Misner's model can concisely be described  as just a left-invariant metric on the  3-sphere; indeed, up to the adjoint action of SU(2), this is actually the  left-invariant metric. As the  metric evolves via Einstein's equation, the geometry of this   typically  distorts anisotropically.

.

Since there is one condition on the three , there should only be two free functions, which Misner chooses to be , defined as

Applications to cosmology

Misner hoped that the chaos would churn up and smooth out the early universe. Also, during periods in which one direction was static (e.g., going from expansion to contraction) formally the Hubble horizon  in that direction is infinite, which he suggested meant that the horizon problem could be solved. Since the directions of expansion and contraction varied, presumably given enough time the horizon problem would get solved in every direction.

While an interesting example of gravitational chaos, it is widely recognized that the cosmological problems the Mixmaster universe attempts to solve are more elegantly tackled by cosmic inflation.  The metric Misner studied is also known as the Bianchi type IX metric.

See also
 Bianchi classification
 BKL singularity

References

Exact solutions in general relativity
Chaotic maps